Parkhudin is a citizen of Afghanistan who was held in extrajudicial detention in the Bagram Collection Point and in the United States Guantanamo Bay detainment camps in Cuba.
His Guantanamo Internment Serial Number was 896.

Tim Golden, of the New York Times, interviewed Parkhudin when he broke the story of how Habibullah and Dilawar died under torture at the Bagram Theater Internment Facility in 2005.

Abduction
In 2002, Parkhudin, a 26-year-old farmer, was a passenger in Dilawar's jitney taxi along with two other men, Abdur Rahim, and Zakim Shah.
All four men were taken captive by Jan Baz Khan, an Afghan militia leader who had a contract to provide security for Forward Operating Base Salerno. Jan Baz Khan told his American contacts that the four men were responsible for firing missiles at the base and he handed them over to the Americans in early December 2002. The men spent their first days in captivity with their hands shackled to the ceiling, suspended in a "stress position". Their heads were covered by a hood, and they were often beaten. Less than a week after their arrival, the taxi driver, Dilawar, died under this torture. Parkhudin, Abdur Rahim and Zakim Shah survived.   Parkhudin was transferred to Guantanamo on 7 February 2003.

Release
Golden reported that by January 2003, less than two months after coming into American captivity, American intelligence analysts concluded that Dilawar and his three passengers were in fact innocent victims of Jan Baz Khan and that the militia fired the missiles themselves. However, it was not until March 2004 that Parkhudin and the others were finally released. Golden reported that, upon their return to Afghanistan, the three men were unable to tell Dilawar's family of how much he had suffered in US captivity.

See also
Bagram torture and prisoner abuse

References

External links
 When Torture Kills: Ten Murders in US Prisons in Afghanistan, Andy Worthington
 Sexual Humiliation is the Norm in Military Prisons

Afghan extrajudicial prisoners of the United States
Living people
Guantanamo detainees known to have been released
Bagram Theater Internment Facility detainees
Year of birth missing (living people)